Slide Rock State Park is an Arizona State Park located in Oak Creek Canyon  north of Sedona, Arizona, United States. It takes its name from a natural water slide formed by the slippery bed of Oak Creek. Slide Rock State Park is located on Coconino National Forest land and is co-managed by the Arizona State Parks agency and the United States Forest Service. Tall red rock formations that are typical of the region also surround the park, which contains a  working apple farm.

History
The land was first developed by Frank L. Pendley, who arrived in the canyon in 1907 and acquired title to the land under the Homestead Act in 1910.  Pendley developed an irrigation system (which is still in use today) and planted an apple orchard in 1912.  The state completed a road through the canyon in 1914, and Pendley built rustic tourist cabins in 1933 that in part survive today.  Several films were shot in the area: Angel and the Badman (1946), Broken Arrow (1950), Drum Beat (1954), and Gun Fury (1953).

The park was purchased by Arizona State Parks from the Arizona Parklands Foundation on July 10, 1985, and officially dedicated as Slide Rock State Park in October 1987. The Pendley Homestead Historic District was accepted onto the National Register of Historic Places on December 23, 1991. The apple farm is one of the few homesteads still preserved in Oak Creek Canyon.

There are three hiking trails in Slide Rock State Park: Pendley Homestead Trail (.25 mile), Slide Rock Route (.3 mile) and Clifftop Nature Trail (.25 mile). Slide Rock State Park attracted 254,584 visitors in 2005 and is one of the most visited tourist attractions in Arizona. In 2014, Slide Rock was named one of Fordor's Travel Top 10 state parks in the United States. Most recently, USA Today readers voted Slide Rock as the fifth best swimming hole in the country.

Gallery

See also

 Schnebly Hill Formation

External links
Slide Rock State Park official site

State parks of Arizona
Coconino National Forest
Parks in Coconino County, Arizona
National Register of Historic Places in Coconino County, Arizona
Protected areas established in 1985
1985 establishments in Arizona